Denis (sometimes Didier) Henrion, was a French mathematician born at the end of the 16th century in France. He co-edited the works of Viète. He died around 1632 in Paris.

Contributions 

Henrion wrote a tract concerning logarithms. 

He translated Euclid's Elements from Latin into French.

He published Problemata nobilissima duo (Paris, 1616), a book against Marin Ghetaldi and attacking Viète and Regiomontanus. Later reorganized, the book was republished by its author.

Works (selection)

Original works 
 Mémoires mathématiques recueillis et dressés en faveur de la noblesse française. Paris, 1613, 4°. Published again in Paris by Fleury Bourriquant, 1623, 8°
 Problemata duo nobilissima, quorum nec analysin geometricam, videntur tenuisse Ioannes Regiomontanus & Petrus Nonius; nec demonstrationem satis accuratam repraesentasse, Franciscus Vieta et Marinus Ghetaldus nunc demum a Clemente Cyriaco diligentius elaborata et novis analyseon formis exculta. Inscriptiones praeterea figurarum non injucundœ. Paris: David Leclerc, 1616, 4°. (Internet Archive link)
 Problematum opus amplissimum et schediasmata poetica et critica (manuscript)
 Deux cens questions ingénieuses et récréatives extraictes et tirées des œuvres mathématiques de Valentin Menher avec quelques annotations de Michel Coignet, le tout corrigé, recueilli et mis en cet ordre, par D.H.P.E.M. Paris, 1620
 L'usage du mécomètre, qui est un instrument géométrique avec lequel on peut très facilement mesurer toutes sortes de longueurs et distances visibles. Paris, 1630, 8°

Translations 
 Les Quinze livres des Éléments d'Euclide, traduits du latin en français. Online: Tables des directions et projections de Jean de Mont-Royal

References

See also
 Alexander Anderson
 Marin Getaldić
 Pierre Hérigone
 Clément Cyriaque de Mangin (who sometimes used 'Denis Henrion' as a pseudonym)
 Claude Mydorge

17th-century French mathematicians
1640 deaths
17th-century French people
Year of birth unknown